The 2016 Euroleague Playoffs was played from 12 April to 26 April 2016. A total of 8 teams competed in the Playoffs.

Format
In the playoffs, teams playing against each other had to win three games to win the series. Thus, if one team won three games, before all five games had been played, the games that remained were omitted. The team that finished in the highest Top 16 place played the first, the second, and the fifth (if it was necessary) game of the series at home.

Game 1 was played on 12 and 13 April, game 2 was played on 14 and 15 April, game 3 was played on 18 and 19 April, game 4, if necessary, was played on 21 April, and game 5, if necessary, was played on 26 April 2016.

Qualified teams

Series

Games

Game 1

Game 2

Game 3

Game 4

Game 5

External links
Official website

2015–16 Euroleague
Euroleague Playoffs